The Park of Generous Souls is a park in Zvolen, Slovakia dedicated to Slovak citizens who helped save Jews during the Holocaust.

References 

Zvolen
Rescue of Jews during the Holocaust
Holocaust memorials